Monacillo is one of the 18 barrios in the municipality of San Juan, Puerto Rico. The barrio included the area that now forms Monacillo Urbano. In 2010, it had a population of 11,442 living in a land area of 1.15 square miles (2.98 km2). Monacillo is surrounded by Monacillo Urbano barrio to the north, Cupey to the east, Caimito to the south, and the municipality of Guaynabo to the west.

Demographics

See also
 List of communities in Puerto Rico

References

Río Piedras, Puerto Rico
Barrios of San Juan, Puerto Rico